C215 Viaduct is a  long box girder bridge completed in 2003, with a cost of around US$40 million. It is located in Taiwan and is part of the Taiwan High Speed Rail network.

See also
 Transportation in Taiwan

References

External links
 http://en.structurae.de/structures/data/index.cfm?ID=s0004210

2005 establishments in Taiwan
Box girder bridges
Taiwan High Speed Rail
Viaducts in Taiwan